John D. Kreamcheck (January 7, 1926 – January 28, 2014) was a professional American football player for the National Football League's Chicago Bears. He played defensive tackle for three seasons between 1953 and 1955.  Kreamcheck played college football at William & Mary.

References

External links
John Kreamcheck @ TribeAthletics.com

1926 births
2014 deaths
American football defensive tackles
Chicago Bears players
Players of American football from Pennsylvania
William & Mary Tribe football players
People from McHenry, Illinois